is a Japanese long jumper. He competed at the 1999 World Championships without reaching the final.

Personal best

International competition

National title
Japanese Championships
Long jump: 1996

References

External links

Shigeru Tagawa at Mizuno Track Club  (archived)

1975 births
Living people
Sportspeople from Niigata Prefecture
Japanese male long jumpers
World Athletics Championships athletes for Japan
Japan Championships in Athletics winners